Motherland is a political party in Ukraine established on August 1, 2001. The head of the party is a general in reserves Vilen Martirosian. Vilen Martirosian is known as one of organizers of the Officer's Club of Ukraine (SOU).

External links
Party profile at rbc
Party profile at the Center of Political Information

2001 establishments in Ukraine
Political parties established in 2001
Political parties in Ukraine